Bunnies & Burrows (B&B) is a role-playing game (RPG) inspired by the 1972 novel Watership Down. Published by Fantasy Games Unlimited in 1976, the game centered on intelligent rabbits. It introduced several innovations to role-playing game design, being the first game to encourage players to have non-humanoid roles, and the first to have detailed martial arts and skill systems. Fantasy Games Unlimited published a similar second edition in 1982. Frog God Games published a revised third edition in 2019 from the original authors. The game was also modified and published by Steve Jackson Games as an official GURPS supplement in 1992.

As rabbits, player characters are faced with dangers mirroring those in the real world. The only true "monsters" in the game are humans, but there are many predators and natural hazards. The characters' position in the food chain promotes an emphasis on role-playing and problem solving over combat.

History

Originally published by Fantasy Games Unlimited in 1976, only two years after the first role-playing game Dungeons & Dragons was published; this edition is now long out of print. The game was inspired by Richard Adams' fantasy novel Watership Down, and the players were given the opportunity to take on the role of rabbits. As such, the game emphasized role-playing over combat for, according to Steffan O'Sullivan, "You're playing a rabbit, after all – how much combat do you want to do?" David M. Ewalt, in his book Of Dice and Men, commented that Bunnies & Burrows "pushed setting even farther" than other early RPGs like Dungeons & Dragons and En Garde!, as the "player characters were intelligent rabbits and had to compete for food, avoid predators, and deal with internal warren politics".

Building on this first edition, in 1979, B. Dennis Sustare wrote "Different Worlds Present the World of Druid's Valley: A Bunnies & Burrows Campaign" in Different Worlds, a magazine published by Chaosium. It detailed how to combine the world of Bunnies & Burrows with other fantasy worlds. This was followed by the mini-adventure "The Jackrabbits' Lair", written by Daniel J. Maxfield, in Pegasus, a magazine published by Judges Guild.

A second edition of Bunnies & Burrows was printed in 1982 by Fantasy Games Unlimited, although the continuing popularity of the first edition is evidenced by how it was still being actively played in 2008.

During a rise of "retro" games in the late 1980s and early 1990s, Steve Jackson Games entered negotiations with Dennis Sustare and Scott Robinson, the current owners of the Bunnies & Burrows copyright, to publish an official GURPS supplement. In 1988, O'Sullivan wrote an unofficial conversion of Bunnies & Burrows to GURPS while the negotiations continued. He indicated that he hoped to one day work on the official supplement. GURPS Bunnies & Burrows was published in 1992.

The setting also had an unofficial conversion in 2004 to be used in Risus: The Anything RPG by Boyd Mayberry under their "Rules for Free Fan-Supplements and Articles".

In 2019, Frog God Games released a 3rd edition of the game after a successful kickstarter campaign.

Gameplay

Bunnies & Burrows was the first role-playing game to allow for non-humanoid play. In addition, it was also the first role-playing game to have detailed martial arts rules (renamed "Bun Fu" in GURPS Bunnies & Burrows) and the first attempt at a skill system. For its time, the game was considered by some "light years" ahead of the Original Dungeons & Dragons.

Players of Bunnies & Burrows take the role of rabbits as their player characters. Interaction with many different animal species is part of normal gameplay. Humans, whose thought processes and motivations are completely alien, are the only monster to be encountered.

Bunnies & Burrows has the advantage of offering players an intuitive grasp of relative dangers and appropriate actions not possible in game worlds that are substantially fictional. For example, a player is told their character is confronted with a fox. There is an immediate intuition on the amount of peril a rabbit is facing. Since player characters are substantially weaker than many of the dangers they face, the game is one of the first to encourage problem solving and outwitting obstacles, rather than out-fighting them.

The mechanics of the role-playing game system were created specifically for Bunnies & Burrows, common at the time of its original publishing. It features eight abilities and eight classes. The task resolution system is based on rolls of percentile dice. Although newer systems have updated game mechanics significantly, the ideas presented in Bunnies & Burrows created the framework for modern role-playing games.

Reception
Steve Jackson reviewed Bunnies & Burrows in The Space Gamer No. 10. Jackson concluded that "B & B is probably worth the retail price [...] at least to a FRP fan. The writing style is intelligent, lucid, and occasionally witty; the rules are workable [...] the art, as I think I pointed out, is so bad it's great; and the whole idea is appealing."

Although the game had "incredible role-playing potential", the concept of role-playing rabbits can be viewed as bizarre, and as such at least one commentator believes that most people thought it was stupid when it was first released. This view is mirrored by Lev Lafayette, who, when describing his first exposure to the game, says "You can't do anything!'".

Reviews
Fantastic Science Fiction v27 n10

Publications

Books
Bunnies & Burrows (1976), Fantasy Games Unlimited
Bunnies & Burrows (Second edition) (1982), Fantasy Games Unlimited
Bunnies & Burrows (Third edition) (2019), Frog God Games

Articles
Different Worlds Present the World of Druid's Valley: A Bunnies & Burrows Campaign (B. Dennis Sustare, 1979). Different Worlds, Chaosium
The Jackrabbits' Lair (Daniel J. Maxfield). Pegasus, Judges Guild

References

Fantasy role-playing games
Watership Down
Fantasy Games Unlimited games
Rabbits and hares in popular culture
Role-playing games introduced in 1976